Veselovsky (masculine), Veselovskaya (feminine), or Veselovskoye (neuter) is the name of several rural localities in Russia:
Veselovsky, Orenburg Oblast, a settlement in Veselovsky Selsoviet of Yasnensky District of Orenburg Oblast
Veselovsky, Rostov Oblast, a khutor in Kuteynikovskoye Rural Settlement of Chertkovsky District of Rostov Oblast
Veselovskoye, a selo in Krasnozyorsky District of Novosibirsk Oblast